John Losee House is a historic home located at Watertown, Jefferson County, New York.  The house was built about 1828, and is a two-story, five bay, Federal style limestone dwelling.  It has a two-story rear frame ell.  It features an elliptical fanlight over the front door.

It was added to the National Register of Historic Places in 2014.

References

Houses on the National Register of Historic Places in New York (state)
Federal architecture in New York (state)
Houses completed in 1828
Houses in Jefferson County, New York
National Register of Historic Places in Jefferson County, New York